David Rivas Rodríguez (born 2 December 1978) is a Spanish retired footballer who played as a central defender.

He spent most of his 16-year professional career with Betis, appearing in 244 competitive games and winning the 2005 Copa del Rey. In La Liga, he amassed totals of 171 matches and seven goals over nine seasons.

Club career
Rivas was born in Dos Hermanas, Province of Seville. Having previously played with the club's B-side, he spent the vast majority of his professional career at Real Betis, making his first-team – and La Liga – debuts during the 1999–2000 season: his first game was on 21 August 1999 as he started in a 0–1 away loss against Athletic Bilbao, with his team eventually suffering relegation. He contributed with 20 second division matches in the following campaign, in an immediate promotion back.

Rivas went on to become an important defensive element for the Andalusians in the following years, becoming club captain and scoring four goals in 32 contests in 2004–05 as Betis achieved qualification honours to the UEFA Champions League (Juanito, the other stopper, added another four). Subsequently, however, dramatic loss of form and a bad run with injuries meant he featured sparingly for the team.

In July 2010, after only 42 league appearances in four seasons combined, 31-year-old Rivas left Betis and Spain for the first time, joining Liga I club FC Vaslui. In September of the following year, he returned to his country and signed for SD Huesca in the second level.

Honours
Betis
Copa del Rey: 2004–05

References

External links

Betisweb stats and bio 

1978 births
Living people
Footballers from Dos Hermanas
Spanish footballers
Association football defenders
La Liga players
Segunda División players
Segunda División B players
Betis Deportivo Balompié footballers
Real Betis players
SD Huesca footballers
Liga I players
FC Vaslui players
Spanish expatriate footballers
Expatriate footballers in Romania
Spanish expatriate sportspeople in Romania